The  was historically the women's quarters of Edo Castle, the section where the women connected to the reigning  resided. Similar areas in the castles of powerful , such as the Satsuma Domain, were also referred to by this term.

History 

This system lasted for nearly 200 years.

Structure 

The  was a performance area for Noh plays, although during the reign of the third  it was also the residence of his wife Takatsukasa Takako, who moved there after her third miscarriage.

Organisation 

The women's quarters included the shōgun's mother, the official wife (seishitsu), and concubines. Rumored to house several thousand women, including maids and servants at one point, the Ōoku was, as much as any other part of Edo Castle, a focal point of political intrigue for the Tokugawa shogunate.

Notable persons
 Kasuga no Tsubone, shōgun Tokugawa Iemitsu's wet nurse. She became the first Jōrō Otoshiyori in 1607 after being recommended by the first Midaidokoro, Oeyo. She managed the Ooku with Oeyo from 1607 until Oeyo died in 1626, and then with Oman no Kata from 1640 until her death in 1643.
 Oman no Kata, the first concubine named a Jōrō Otoshiyori. She later acted as adoptive mother to two Iemitsu's children, Chiyohime and Tokugawa Ietsuna, the fourth shogun. She was a concubine of Tokugawa Iemitsu and retired in March 1657.
 Yajima no Tsubone, shōgun Tokugawa Ietsuna's wet nurse. She became the third Jōrō Otoshiyori in 1656 after Oman no Kata's retirement, and later was banished from Ōoku in 1675 after her plots against several of the other women of the Ooku were discovered by Ietsuna:
 In 1675, she poisoned the powder used by Asa no Miya Akiko, which blinded her; the resulting stress contributed to her death a year later.
 In 1667 she poisoned the lipstick of Ofuri no Kata, who was then pregnant; Ofuri suffered a miscarriage and died soon after. Yajima's motive in poisoning Ofuri was to allow her daughter to become the mother of Ietsuna's sole heir, but this was not to be as her daughter also later miscarried after falling down the stairs.
 Lady Emonnosuke, the second and last concubine to be named Jōrō Otoshiyori, and the concubine of Tokugawa Tsunayoshi from 1683 until her death in January 1705.
 Lady Akimoto, who became Jōrō Otoshiyori in 1705 after the death of Lady Emonnosuke. She retired in 1709.
 Ejima, Jōrō Otoshiyori and the personal ladyship of Gekkoin, mother of seventh shōgun. Held the office from 1709 until 1714. She was expelled from Ōoku in 1714 due to her relationship with a man named Ikushima Shingoro.This tragedy came to be known as Ejima-Ikushima affair.
 Fujinami, Jōrō Otoshiyori and the personal ladyship of Ten'ei-in, widow of the sixth shogun. In office beginning in 1714.
 Lady Takaoka, Jōrō Otoshiyori during the reign of Tokugawa Ieharu. In office from 1765 to 1787.
 Lady Anekoji (1810–1880), Jōrō Otoshiyori from the reign of Tokugawa Ienari until that of Tokugawa Ieyoshi. In office from 1826 to 1844.
 Lady Utahashi, wet nurse of Tokugawa Iesada, personal ladyship of Lady Honjuin (mother of Iesada) and Jōrō Otoshiyori during the reign of Tokugawa Ieyoshi. In office from 1844 to 1853.
 Ikushima, the personal ladyship of Tenshōin. She retired from the Ōoku at 1859 and stayed with Muraoka, the senior ladyship of the Konoe family, until her death. She was buried at Satsuma.
 Niwata Tsuguko of Kyoto, the personal ladyship of Princess Kazunomiya, Iemochi's wife. She died 1868 in the Ōoku.
 Takiyama (1805–1876), the Jōrō Otoshiyori. She served the previous shōgun, including Tokugawa Iesada and Atsuhime/Tenshōin, Tokugawa Iemochi and Kazunomiya/Seikan'in-no miya, and the last shōgun Tokugawa Yoshinobu. After a new government took over Edo Castle, she moved to Kawaguchi in Saitama Prefecture. Her remains were buried in Shakujo-ji Temple. In office from 1853 to 1867.

In popular culture
As no painting exists of the interior, ukiyo-e artists such as Hashimoto Chikanobu and Toyohara Chikanobu created a number of prints that depict life as imagined inside the women's quarters. However, there are many modern popular portrayals of the Ōoku:
 Ōoku, a 1983 51-episode TV series
 Ōoku: Hana no Ran, a Japanese television drama running between 2003–2006
 Ōoku: The Inner Chambers, a manga series running between 2004–2022
 Oh! Oku, a 2006 film
 Atsuhime, a 2008 NHK Taiga drama

Notes
The name and title of "Ōoku" was given by Oeyo, Tokugawa Hidetada's wife
Her name before Iemitsu become the third shōgun
her name after Iemitsu become the third shōgun

References

External links

Edo Castle
Edo period
Women of medieval Japan
Women's quarters